Vung Tau Airport  is a small airport in southern Vietnam, in the Bà Rịa–Vũng Tàu province. The airport serves the city of Vũng Tàu and is located near the downtown of the city.

Facilities
There is a 1,800 m paved runway (as of 2006). The airport is capable of handling small aircraft such as ATR-72 and AN-38.

History
The airport was originally established as Cap St Jacques Airfield in the French colonial period.

Airlines and destinations

The Southern Service Flight Company provides helicopter services for petroleum exploration and production activities offshore of Vũng Tàu. It also provides twice weekly flights to Con Dao Airport.

See also

 Vung Tau
 List of airports in Vietnam

References 

Airports in Vietnam
Buildings and structures in Bà Rịa-Vũng Tàu province